Friedrich Bertram Sixt von Armin (27 November 1851 – 30 September 1936) was a German general who participated in the Franco-Prussian War and the First World War. In the latter he participated in many battles on the Western Front, including the Battles of Passchendaele and the Lys.

Early life 

Armin was born in Wetzlar, an exclave of the Rhine Province, Prussia. After leaving school in 1870, he joined the 4th Grenadier Guards Regiment as a cadet and was seriously wounded in the Franco-Prussian War at the Battle of Gravelotte. He was awarded the Iron Cross, Second Class and promoted to lieutenant. He subsequently served as adjutant of the regiment and also held other positions on the regimental staff. In 1900, Armin was promoted to Oberst (colonel) and given command of the 55th Infantry Regiment. The following year, he was appointed Chief of Staff of the Gardekorps. He was promoted to major general in 1903 and to lieutenant general in 1906. Following a period of service at general headquarters in 1908, Armin was appointed commander of the 13th Division, stationed in Münster. In 1911, he succeeded Paul von Hindenburg as commanding officer of the IV Corps in Magdeburg and in 1913, Armin was promoted to general.

Family 

He married on the 11 June 1882 Klara Pauline Auguste von Voigts-Rhetz, born October 1859 in Berlin. She was the daughter of Prussian general Julius von Voigts-Rhetz. A son Hans-Heinrich also had a military career. As Lieutenant general he became a prisoner of war in 1942 and died in Russia in 1952.

World War I 

At the beginning of the First World War, Armin and the IV Corps were a part of the 1st Army on the Western Front, where they fought in the trench warfare that defined the first years of the conflict. For his handling of combat operations on the Western Front, particularly at Arras and on the Somme, he was awarded the Pour le Mérite in 1916. The following year he was appointed commander of the 4th Army and also served as commander-in-chief in the Flanders region. During his time as commander, the 4th Army withstood several attacks from British and French armies, notably the Third Battle of Ypres. For his performance as commander, Armin was awarded the Order of the Black Eagle, as well as the oak leaf cluster to the Pour le Mérite. Armin was still in command of the 4th Army during the German spring offensive of 1918. On 25 April, his troops captured the Kemmelberg, although they were later forced to retreat to the Antwerp–Maas defensive line. With the signing of the Armistice on 11 November, Armin took command of Army Group A and returned with it to Germany, where, following the demobilisation of his troops, he resigned.

Later life 

After the war, Armin lived in Magdeburg, Province of Saxony, where he was a popular speaker and made frequent appearances at public events. When he died in 1936, he was buried with full military honors.

Decorations and awards
 Knight of the Order of the Black Eagle (Prussia, ca.1917)
 Order of the Red Eagle 2rd Class with Crown and Oak Leaves. 
 Knight of the House Order of Hohenzollern
 Pour le Mérite (Prussia, 10 August 1916), with Oak Leaves Cluster (Prussia, ca.1917)
 Member of the Order of Saint John (Bailiwick of Brandenburg)
 Iron Cross of 1870, 2nd class
 Commander's Cross of the Military Order of St. Henry (Saxony, 7 May 1918)
 Knight of the Albert Order (Saxony)
 Knight of the Friedrich Order (Württemberg)
 Knight of the Order of Berthold I (Baden)
 Military Merit Medal (Austria-Hungary)
 Honorary title "Lion of Flanders"
 Magdeburg Barracks (1928) and Sixt-von-Armin-Weg in Magdeburg (1933) were named after him, both were renamed subsequently.

Notes

References 
 Jörn Winkelvoß, Magdeburger Biographisches Lexikon, Magdeburg 2002,

External links 
 

1851 births
1936 deaths
People from Wetzlar
People from the Rhine Province
German military personnel of the Franco-Prussian War
German Army generals of World War I
Generals of Infantry (Prussia)
Recipients of the Iron Cross (1870), 2nd class
Recipients of the Pour le Mérite (military class)
Grand Crosses of the Military Order of Max Joseph
Military personnel from Hesse